The 1999–2000 Cymru Alliance was the tenth season of the Cymru Alliance after its establishment in 1990. The league was won by Oswestry Town.

League table

External links
Cymru Alliance

Cymru Alliance seasons
2
Wales